Wen Jieruo (born July 1927) is a Chinese translator, author and editor. She translated literature from English and Japanese to Chinese. Wen is a member of China Writers Association and Chinese Translation Association. She is fluent in both English and Japanese.

For her contributions to the introduction of Japanese literature to foreign readers, she was honored with the Japanese Foreign Minister Recognition Award in 2000 and the Order of the Sacred Treasure in 2002.

Biography
Wen was born Wen Tongxin in July 1927 in Beijing, with her ancestral home in Guiyang, Guizhou, the daughter of Wan Peilan and  Wen Zongshu, a Chinese diplomat, he held the post of consul general for the Republic of China at Yokohama. She has six brothers and sisters. Her grandfather Wen Mingqin was a magistrate in Guangxi during the late Qing dynasty (1644–1911).

At the age of 7, she attended Kongde School, the predecessor of Beijing No.27 High school. One year later, Wen moved to Tokyo, living with her father. In February 1936, her father was removed from office, Wen returned to Beijing, studying at Furen School. After the Second Sino-Japanese War, Wen was accepted to Tsinghua University, where she majored in English.

During her university career, Wen started her translation practice, she translated Guo Moruo's Goddess into English. After graduation, Wen worked in SDX Joint Publishing Company and People's Literature Publishing House in different positions, including editor, senior editor and translator of Japanese literature.

During the Cultural Revolution, her husband Xiao Qian was labeled as a "rightist" by the Communist government, they were sent to the May Seventh Cadre Schools to work. After the Cultural Revolution, in 1979, she joined the China Writers Association.

From 1985 to 1986, Wen visited Japan.

Wen retired in July 1990. From 1990 to 1994, Wen and her husband Xiao Qian spent four years translating James Joyce's notable novel Ulysses into Chinese.

Personal life
Wen married a Chinese translator and author Xiao Qian, the couple has two sons and a daughter. Their daughter Xiao Lizi was born on 30 January 1955. Their son, Xiao Tong, was born on November 10, 1956. All of her children are living in the United States.

Translations
 Kojiki
 The Pillow Book
 The Tale of the Heike
 The Decay of the Angel (Yukio Mishima)
 Man'yōshū
 (Jun'ichirō Tanizaki)
 Rashōmon (Ryūnosuke Akutagawa)
 The Holy Man of Mount Kōya (Kyōka Izumi)
 (Natsume Sōseki)
 (Seichō Matsumoto)
 (Seichō Matsumoto)
 (Junichi Watanabe)
 Les Misérables (Victor Hugo)
 Ulysses (James Joyce)
 Stories from the Bible (Mary Batchelor)

Works
 Memories of Old Friends in the Wind and Rain
 A Lifetime of Love
 Letters to Family
 Bajin and Xiao Qian

Awards
 Japanese Foreign Minister Recognition Award (2000)
 The Order of the Sacred Treasure (2002)
 Chinese Translation Association – Lifetime Achievement Award (2012)

References

External links

1927 births
Writers from Beijing
Tsinghua University alumni
Japanese–Chinese translators
English–Chinese translators
People's Republic of China translators
Living people
20th-century Chinese translators
21st-century Chinese translators